The Ewa Reactor was Poland's first research nuclear reactor. Its name was derived from the first letters of the Polish words: Eksperymentalny (Experimental), Wodny (Water), and Atomowy (Atomic) as a reference to Ève Curie.

History
The reactor was activated on June 14, 1958, in the Instytut Badań Jądrowych (Institute of Nuclear Research) (Currently the Instytut Energii Atomowej [Atomic Energy Institute] ) in Otwock near Warsaw. It was deactivated in February 1995 due to a shortage of uranium for experiments, and reactivated in April of the same year after the acquisition of new fuel. The reactor is currently deactivated and partially dismantled.

Ewa was based on the Soviet VVR-S design, had an initial power of 2 MW, was fueled by enriched uranium, and moderated by pressurized water. In 1963 and 1967, the reactor underwent two major overhauls that improved the safety of the reaction and allowed for the use of better enriched fuels. After these changes, the reactor's power increased first to 4 MW and ultimately to 10 MW. Its primary use was for producing radioactive isotopes. It functioned an average of 3,500 hours a year.

Because of its design, the reactor is currently considered a potential site for the future site of storage of the spent fuel from the Maria reactor.

References

See also

Maria reactor
Anna reactor
List of nuclear reactors

Nuclear research reactors
Nuclear research institutes
Research institutes in Poland
Neutron facilities